was a Japanese adventurer, best known for circling Japan on bicycle, and traveling to the North Pole.  He was born in the town of Ikata, Ehime, Japan.

Kōno died in 2001 while attempting to walk from the North Pole back to his hometown.  A memorial display entitled "Reaching Home" was erected at the Seto Agriculture Park in Ikata to honor him.  It includes a signpost noting the names, dates, and distances of locations he traveled to.  It reads as follows:

1958 births
2001 deaths
Japanese explorers
People from Ehime Prefecture